Doctors holding the DC (Doctor of Chiropractic) degree may claim numerous credentials, denoted by letters placed after the doctor's name in official correspondences and business publications.  Some of these credentials are recognized by the Chiropractic academic community at large, and some only by the specific organization that issued the credential.  This list clarifies the meanings of the various credentials.

Academic pre/post doctoral degrees
DC (Doctor of Chiropractic) Degree:  The vast majority of chiropractors in the U.S. today are graduates of fully accredited "first professional degree" granting institutions. This means that the DC degree is accredited by one of the regional accrediting agencies, (e.g. Middle States Association of Colleges and Schools), or National accrediting agencies (e.g.  the New York State Board of Regents). The DC degree is also listed as a "First Professional Degree". Chiropractors in the United States are required to pass structured board-type exams in order to practice Chiropractic professionally.

International chiropractic degrees

Academic pre or post-doctoral graduate degrees
Some chiropractors have received Masters or Doctoral Degrees from another accredited college or university before they commenced chiropractic college, and some achieved those degrees after they received their DC degrees. Some chiropractic colleges are accredited to offer Masters and PhD degrees in related fields, such as nutrition, Traditional Chinese Medicine (TCM), or acupuncture.

Diplomate / Fellow
As a general rule, as defined by the dictionary, one who receives a diploma is a diplomate. Thus, the "Diplomate" programs are post-doctoral programs leading to a Board examination. The successful candidate receives the degree. Whereas a medical fellowship implies completion of a post-residency subspecialty training program, in other fields, the term fellow is, generally speaking, an honorary title, usually awarded to someone who is already a diplomate, for extraordinary contributions to that specific field of study. Some agencies confer only the title of "Fellow" when they have no diplomate programs.

Certifications recognized by the chiropractic academic community 
"Recognized" means that the Chiropractic academic community generally recognizes these certifications as representing a program of advanced study at, or through an accredited institution, and that the holder has passed a certifying examination.

Board certifications recognized by the chiropractic academic community 
"Recognized" means by the Chiropractic Profession generally.  Some of these are also accredited by other professional specialty credentialing agencies.

Honorary titles conferred by recognized chiropractic bodies

Certifications conferred by outside agencies
These certifications are not unique to chiropractic but may be given to other health care professionals in other fields.

CHC
Certified Health Coach
This certification is conferred by the Wellness Education Foundation upon those who complete their proprietary certification. One must have a BA/BS degree, and complete a certifying examination, including a skills evaluation component, and have practical experience.

Certifications and Boards from proprietary organizations 
These credentials are generally recognized only by the bodies which grant them,  and may be meaningful only to another DC. They may indicate that the Doctor has taken some proprietary course in someone's technique, but the program may, or may not yet be taught at accredited academic institutions.

Other titles 
These certifications are not generally considered a "professional qualification" and therefore are not listed after one's name nor used in advertising.

References

Chiropractic